Slaviša Đurković (born 18 August 1968) is a former Montenegrin footballer who played as a defender.

Club career
He played in the juvenile ranks of FK Sutjeska Nikšić and featured the Yugoslavia national under-20 football team that won the title at the 1987 FIFA World Youth Championship. Đurković stayed at Second league team Sutjeska where his career didn't prosper with the start of the Yugoslav Wars. Đurković joined Leotar and had spells with Jedinstvo and Budućnost.

He started coaching FC Polet Stars and more recently he became the coach of Sutjeska Nikšić's youth academy. In 2011 Đurković and former youth worldcup teammate Ranko Zirojević were denied a pension for their sport-achievements by the Montenegrin authorities. In August 2011 he joined the UEFA A-license course for trainers.

References

External links

1968 births
Living people
Association football defenders
Yugoslav footballers
Montenegrin footballers
Serbia and Montenegro footballers
FK Sutjeska Nikšić players
FK Leotar players
FK Budućnost Valjevo players
Yugoslav First League players
Yugoslav Second League players
Second League of Serbia and Montenegro players
Yugoslavia under-21 international footballers